Rachael Sage (born Karen Rachael Weitzman in 1971) is an American singer-songwriter and visual artist. She is the founder of indie label MPress Records. Sage has released fourteen solo studio albums. Sage was named one of the Top 100 Independent Artists of the Past 15 Years by Performing Songwriter magazine. The New York Times describes Sage as "alternately channeling her inner Fanny Brice and Jewish Norah Jones".

Early life
Sage was born Karen Rachael Weitzman in 1971 in Port Chester, New York, to shoe designer Stuart Weitzman and his wife, Jane. Sage studied drama and ballet before switching to music. A self-taught pianist, influenced by her parents' doo-wop and the Beatles records, as well as Broadway cast albums, she created demos on a four-track recording system she received as a bat mitzvah present. During junior high school, Sage gained admission to the School of American Ballet. Sage attended Stanford University where she hosted a nighttime college radio show as "Full Moon Rachael". She studied theater with professors such as playwright Anna Deavere Smith, and graduated in 1993 with a degree in drama. For one year, she was in the Actors Studio MFA program. Her performance in their New York talent search won her a place on the Village Stage of the 1999 Lilith Fair.

Music
Sage's career includes the writing of jingles and theme music for film and television; her first notable jingle customer was Crystal Light. She began using the name "Rachael Sage" in 1995, and in 1996 she started her own record label, MPress Records, inspired by Ani DiFranco founding Righteous Babe Records six years earlier.

On April 23, 1996, Sage released her debut studio album, Morbid Romantic, on MPress. She toured Europe four times and released four more albums.

For her 2004 song "Sacrifice" from the album Ballads & Burlesque, Sage won Best Folk/Singer-Songwriter Song at the 4th Annual Independent Music Awards in 2005. "Brave Mistake" from the album Delancey Street was nominated for Best Story Song at the 10th Annual Independent Music Awards in 2011. In the same year, Sage won OutStanding Producer for her song "Hope's Outpost" at the 7th Annual OutMusic Awards.

Sage wrote an editorial about homeless youth in New York City for The Morton Report. In her editorial, she mentioned a collaboration of artists, unveiling an album, New Arrivals Vol. 4: Artists Against Youth Homelessness, with proceeds going to the National Network for Youth.

Sage appears on Both Sides Now: the Very Best of Judy Collins, performing a duet with Collins on the Neil Young song, "Helpless".

On May 20, 2016, Sage released her 12th studio album, Choreographic, on MPress Records, featuring some of the songs that she wrote to accompany dance competition routines for Maddie Ziegler.

On March 6, 2020, Sage released her 14th studio album, Character. Described as an "inspirational tribute to survivorship", the album was written as Sage was recovering from endometrial cancer. She expressed the hope that "these songs honor just how resilient the human spirit can be, and remind us that sometimes it's ok to not be ok." The album reflects on themes such as compassion, gratitude, authenticity, optimism, mindfulness, forgiveness, vulnerability, and resilience, as well as issues surrounding co-dependence.

Sage regularly tours in North America and Europe and has shared stages with A Great Big World, Semi Precious Weapons, Sarah McLachlan, Judy Collins, Marc Cohn, the Animals, Jamie Cullum, and Ani DiFranco.

Sage's sound has been described as theatrical. Producer Phil Ramone said of working with Sage that he was reminded of collaborating with Bob Dylan and that "She has a very unusual way of treating a pop song. I admire her editorial and musical ability when it comes to crafting a tune."

Visual arts
Sage's paintings and collages have been shown in small galleries in Lower Manhattan, and she has also contributed original artwork to her own CD package designs.

Personal life
Sage's sister Elizabeth is a film critic and children's book author in New York.

Sage told Curve magazine in 2020 that she came out to her parents as bisexual in the mid-1990s. She said her songs portray her "full-range of life-experience, including having loved both men and women". Sage has been celebrated by the LGBT community, winning OutMusic Awards multiple times, hosted by the LGBT Academy of Recording Arts. In 2016, she teamed with cellist Dave Eggar to produce a benefit concert to help victims of the Orlando nightclub shooting, a hate crime against gay people.

In 2018, Sage was treated for uterine cancer; she was in remission two years later when she organized an online benefit concert to fight cancer, with appearances by Lisa Loeb, Paula Cole and more. Sage stayed in New Haven, Connecticut, during the COVID-19 pandemic.

Discography

Studio albums
Morbid Romantic (1996)
Smashing the Serene (1998)
Painting of a Painting (2001)
Illusion's Carnival (2002)
Public Record (2003)
Ballads & Burlesque (2004)
The Blistering Sun (2006)
Chandelier (2008)
Delancey Street (2010)
Haunted by You (2012)
Blue Roses (2014)
Choreographic (2016)
Myopia (2018)
Character (2020)

Acoustic albums
Choreographic (Acoustic) (2016)
PseudoMyopia (2019)

EPs
Haunted by You – Acoustic EP (2012)
New Destination (2014)
The Tide (2017)
Character (Acoustic) (2020)

Collaborations
New Arrivals Vol. 1: Artists For Gulf Coast Hurricane Relief (2006)
New Arrivals Vol. 2: Artists Against Hunger & Poverty (2007)
New Arrivals Vol. 3: Artists For Eating Disorders Awareness (2008)
New Arrivals Vol. 4: Artists Against Youth Homelessness (2011)
New Arrivals Vol. 5: Artists For Hurricane Sandy Relief (2013)
Both Sides Now – The Very Best Of Judy Collins (2014)
Poetica (2021)

Awards and nominations
Sage has received numerous awards and nominations, which includes winning the John Lennon Songwriting Contest in 2001, three wins at The Great American Song Contest, and five wins at the Independent Music Awards.

MPress Records
Rachael Sage started MPress Records in 1996 to release her own music. She is the label's president.

Notable artists include:
 Rachael Sage
 A Fragile Tomorrow
 K's Choice
 Melissa Ferrick
 Seth Glier

References

External links

 Official website
 MPress Records

People from Port Chester, New York
People from New Haven, Connecticut
Living people
21st-century American keyboardists
American singer-songwriters
American rock songwriters
American rock singers
American folk singers
American women singer-songwriters
Jewish American musicians
American LGBT rights activists
Fast Folk artists
Independent Music Awards winners
Celesta players
American rock keyboardists
American LGBT writers
American LGBT musicians
Jewish folk singers
20th-century American keyboardists
20th-century American singers
21st-century American singers
20th-century American women singers
21st-century American women singers
1971 births
21st-century American Jews
Stanford University alumni